Julian Goodare is a professor of history at University of Edinburgh.

Academic career
Goodare studied at the University of Edinburgh in the 1980s, afterwards engaged as a postdoctoral fellow. He lectured at the University of Wales, and at the University of Sheffield. He returned to work at Edinburgh in 1998. He was the co-director of the Survey of Scottish Witchcraft alongside Louise Yeoman. In 2019, he called for a memorial to Scotland's tortured and executed witches.

Goodare has published articles and book chapters on crown finance in the early modern period. Subjects include the administration known as the Octavians, and the annual sums of money which Elizabeth I gave James VI of Scotland, which he argues ought to be known as the English subsidy. He explored the significance of the "Ainslie Bond", made in support of the Earl of Bothwell, in the light of Jenny Wormald's work on comparable bonds.

Publications

 Adams, S. and Goodare, J. (eds.) (2014) Scotland in the Age of Two Revolutions. Woodbridge: Boydell and Brewer
 Boardman, S. and Goodare, J. (eds.) (2014) Kings, Lords and Men in Scotland and Britain, 1300-1625: Essays in Honour of Jenny Wormald. Edinburgh: Edinburgh University Press
 Goodare, J. (ed.) (2013) Scottish Witches and Witch-Hunters. Basingstoke: Palgrave Macmillan
 Goodare, J. 'The Debts of James VI of Scotland', Economic History Review, 62:4 (November 2009), pp. 926–952 
 Goodare, J. and MacDonald, A. (eds.) (2008) Sixteenth-Century Scotland: Essays in honour of Michael Lynch. Leiden: Brill DOI: https://doi.org/10.1163/ej.9789004168251.i-476
 Goodare, J., Martin, L. and Miller, J. (eds.) (2008) Witchcraft and Belief in Early Modern Scotland. Basingstoke: Palgrave Macmillan
 Goodare, J. (ed.) (2002) The Scottish Witch-Hunt in Context. Manchester: Manchester Univ. Press
 Goodare, J. and Lynch, M. (eds.) (2000) The Reign of James VI. East Linton: Tuckwell Press
 Goodare, J. (1999) State and Society in Early Modern Scotland. Oxford: Oxford University Press

References 

Living people
Alumni of the University of Edinburgh
British historians
Year of birth missing (living people)
Monarchy and money